Fariba or Fareba (Persian: فریبا) is a Persian name and it means alluring, charming, attractive. It is popular in Iran and Afghanistan. The following individuals have the name:
Surname
Behtash Fariba (b. 1955), retired Iranian football player
Given name
Fariba Adelkhah (b. 1959), Franco-Iranian anthropologist
Fariba Ahmadi Kakar, the representative of Kandahar Province in Afghanistan 's Wolesi Jirga 
Fariba Nawa (b. 1973), Afghan-American freelance journalist 
Fariba Nejat (b. 1957), an Iranian-American community leader and social activist
Fariba Vafi (b. 1962), Iranian author

Persian feminine given names

My name is Fariba